Moner Mayur was a Bengali drama film directed by Sushil Majumdar based on a story of Bengali novelist Protiva Bose. This movie was released in 1954 under the banner of Rama Chhayachitra Ltd. The music direction was done by Satyajit Majumdar. This movie stars Uttam Kumar, Bharati Devi, Kanu Banerjee, Tulsi Chakraborty and Bhanu Bannerjee in the lead roles.

Plot

Cast
 Uttam Kumar 
 Kanu Banerjee
 Tulsi Chakraborty 
 Bhanu Bannerjee
 Bikash Roy
 Jahor Roy
 Bharati Devi
 Ajit Chatterjee
 Nripati Chattopadhyay 
 Chandrabati Devi
 Krishnadhan Mukherjee
 Suprava Mukherjee

References

External links
 

1954 films
Bengali-language Indian films
1954 drama films
1950s Bengali-language films
Indian drama films
Films based on short fiction